First played in 1999,The National Sevens Circuit is an annual series of  rugby sevens tournaments run by the Kenya Rugby Union in conjunction with host clubs featuring teams from across the country. Teams compete for the National Sevens Circuit title by accumulating points based on their finishing position in each tournament. The season’s circuit currently comprises 6 tournaments in 6 cities and towns across Kenya.

After a two year hiatus due to the COVID-19 pandemic, the National Sevens Circuit will resume in May of 2022.

2019 National Sevens Circuit Dates

20/21 July – Kakamega Sevens, Bull Ring Kakamega

27/28 July – Kabeberi Sevens,  RFUEA Ground, Nairobi

3/4 August – BREAK

10/11 August – Dala Sevens, Mamboleo Showground, Kisumu

17/18 August – Prinsloo Sevens, Nakuru Athletic Club, Nakuru

24/25 August – BREAK

31 August/1 September – Christie Sevens, RFUEA Ground, Nairobi

7/8 September – Driftwood Sevens, Mombasa Sports Club, Mombasa

History of seven-a-side rugby in East Africa

RAF Sevens

The first seven-a-side competition in Kenya was the 1937 RAF Sevens.  The cup for this annual competition was presented by 223 Squadron, Royal Air Force and the competition was open to all clubs in East Africa (i.e. within Kenya Colony, Uganda Protectorate and Tanganyika Territory) and any other combination of players who wished to enter a team.  The tournament was usually played over the August Bank Holiday weekend and was a very popular addition to the Kenya rugby and Nairobi social calendars.

Incidentally 223 Squadron (The squadron was based at RAF Eastleigh - now Moi Air Base - Nairobi) were the first RAF squadron to field a rugby team in East Africa, though they were far from the first military team as Royal Navy vessels had been playing against the colonists since, at the latest, 1922.  The "Royal Air Force (Kenya) RFC" first fielded a team in 1937 captained by a Corporal Clarke with Pilot Officer Roden as vice-captain and the team owed a lot to the behind-the-scenes work of Squadron Leader Pitcairn-Hill.  In about 1955 the team changed its name to "United Services Eastleigh RFC" when captained by Flight Lieutenant Frielich with Corporal Freeman as vice-captain, with the administrative assistance of Squadron Leader Warren and Flight Officer Goodwin.  Players of note during the club's early years include a three-quarter called Mickelthwaite, a fly-half called Cahou and another three-quarter, Tony Hale, all three of whom were on the cusp of selection for Kenya and/or East Africa.

Nakuru Sevens

The first Nakuru sevens were held in approximately 1949, usually being held fairly early in the season, attracting entrants from West Kenya and Central Province.  The original cup was lost within a few years of the start of the tournament so early winners are uncertain.  A replacement cup was kindly presented by Mr. HO Salt and was known as the Salt Cup.

Nile Sevens

The first Nile Sevens were held in 1950 and were held annually for at least the next ten years.  The winner is presented with a mounted silver rugby ball known as the Krell Trophy which was presented in 1951 for this purpose by Mr. Cecil Krell who had done valuable work for rugby union in East Africa in both Dar es Salaam and Mombasa.

Teams for the Nile Sevens could be entered by clubs or by any combination of players, hence the unfamiliar team names for some of the winners.

Jones Cup (Sevens)

The Jones Cup was named after MJU Stompie Jones, a former Eldoret player whose representative playing career spanned an astonishing 20 years.  He played for Kenya against the touring Combined South African Universities team in 1930 and against the University of Stellenbosch in 1935 and finally for East Africa against the University of Cape Town in 1949/50.

Ironically, having been named for someone who had demonstrated unparalleled longevity, the Jones Cup was to have a remarkably short tenure as a seven-a-side trophy.  In 1954, after just two years, it was redesignated as the trophy for the winner of the West Kenya zone of the Enterprise Cup.

Other sevens tournaments in Kenya

 International Competitions
 Safari Sevens, hosted by the Kenya Rugby Football Union.
 Club Competitions
 Kilunda Sevens, hosted by Kilunda RFC, Machakos Golf Club, Machakos.

References